Kristin Kverneland Lønningdal (1 January 1923 – 23 February 2010) was a Norwegian politician for the Conservative Party.

She was born in Stavanger and was educated as a pharmacist in 1947. Lønningdal was a member of the executive committee of Stavanger city council from 1963 to 1973. From 1967 to 1973 she was also a member of Rogaland county council. She was elected to the Parliament of Norway from Rogaland in 1973, and was re-elected in 1977. She had previously served as a deputy representative during the terms 1965–1969 and 1969–1973.  Her political career ended with the post of County Governor of Rogaland, which she held from 1982 to 1991.

Lønningdal was a member of the Conservative Party central board from 1969 to 1974. She was a board member of Stavanger Boligbyggelag from 1963 to 1973, of Stavanger Hospital from 1964 (deputy chair from 1971 to 1973) and a deputy board member of Den Norske Stats Oljeselskap from 1968 to 1976.

References

 

1923 births
2010 deaths
Politicians from Stavanger
Conservative Party (Norway) politicians
Members of the Storting
County governors of Norway
Women members of the Storting
20th-century Norwegian politicians
20th-century Norwegian women politicians